The Joutseno railway station is located in the town of Lappeenranta, Finland, in the district of Joutseno. It is located along the Kouvola–Joensuu railway, and its neighboring stations are Lappeenranta in the west and Imatra in the east.

Services 
Joutseno is served by most long-distance trains (InterCity and Pendolino) that use the Kouvola–Joensuu line as part of their route.

External links 
 
 Train departures and arrivals at Joutseno on Finrail

References 

Lappeenranta
Railway stations in South Karelia
Thure Hellström railway stations